Costello is a surname. It is often found among people of Irish origin, though other ethnic backgrounds may possess it (like some Italian-Americans).

History
The Irish surnames Costello, Costelloe, and Costellow are anglicized forms of the Gaelic surname Mac Oisdealbhaigh, itself a Gaelicized form of an Anglo-Norman name. This was the first example of a Norman family assuming a Gaelic name.

This surname has been mainly borne by a notable Irish family who claimed descent from Jocelyn de Angulo, an Anglo-Norman mercenary who accompanied Richard de Clare to Ireland in 1170 during the Anglo-Norman invasion of Ireland.

An early record of the name in Ireland appears in the 17th century Annals of the Four Masters where the name is mentioned in the entry for the year in 1193: Inis Clothrann do orgain la macaibh Oisdealb, & la macaibh Conchobhair Maonmaighe. (Inishcloghbran was plundered by the sons of Oisdealb, and the sons of Conor Moinmoy.) The descendants of Oisdealb then became referred to by the family name Mac Oisdealbhaigh (son of Oisdealb).

Costello has also occasionally has been adopted as a pseudonym or stage name by famous people of Italian descent, including Al Costello (né Giacomo Costa), Frank Costello (né Francesco Castiglia) and Lou Costello (né Louis Francis Cristillo).

People
Al Costello (1919–2000), the ring name of Italian-Australian professional wrestler Giacomo Costa
Anthony Costello (born 1953), British paediatrician and professor 
Anthony J. Costello, Australian urologist
Ashley Costello, Lead vocalist for New Years Day 
Barry M. Costello (born 1951), United States Navy Vice Admiral
Billy Costello (boxer) (1956–2011), American boxer
Cormac Costello (born 1994), Gaelic football player 
Carol Costello (born 1961), American news reporter
Daniel Rae Costello (born 1961), Pacific musician
Declan Costello (1926–2011) Irish High Court Judge
Desmond Patrick Costello (1912-1964), linguist, soldier, diplomat and academic
Diosa Costello (1913–2013), American actress
Dolores Costello (1903–1979), American film actress
Dubhaltach Caoch Mac Coisdealbhaigh (died 1667), Irish soldier and rapparee
Edward Costello (1887–1916), Irish Citizen Army volunteer who died during the Easter Rising
Elvis Costello (born 1954), English singer and musician, born Declan Patrick MacManus
Frank Costello (1891–1973), American criminal and mobster (born in Italy as Francesco Castiglia; took the Costello name in the 1920s)
Frank Costello (footballer)  (1884–1914), English footballer who played for Southampton and West Ham United
Helene Costello (1906–1957), American film actress
Herman T. Costello (1920–2017), American politician
Jensine Costello, (born 1886), Norwegian painter
Jerry Costello (born 1949), American politician
Joe Costello (politician) (born 1945), Irish Labour Party politician
John Costello (baseball) (born 1960), American baseball pitcher
John Costello (historian) (1943–1995), British historian
John Costello (Medal of Honor recipient) (1850–?), U.S. Navy sailor and Medal of Honor recipient
John Costello (pastoralist) (1838–1923), Australian pastoralist
John A. Costello (1891–1976), Taoiseach of Ireland
John M. Costello (1903–1976), U.S. Representative from California
Joseph Costello (electronic design automation) (born 1953), American computer scientist
Joseph Arthur Costello (1915–1978), American Catholic bishop
Larry Costello (1931–2001), American professional basketball coach
Les Costello (1928–2002), Canadian ice hockey player and Catholic priest
Lou Costello (1906–1959), Italian-American actor and comedian (born Louis Francis Cristillo), part of Abbott and Costello
Louis B. Costello (1876–1959), American businessman and newspaper editor
Louisa Stuart Costello (1799–1870), British author and poet
Mark Costello (disambiguation), several people
Matt Costello (born 1993), basketball player
Matthew J. Costello (born 1948), American science fiction author
Maurice Costello (1877–1950), American stage and screen actor
Michael Costello (fashion designer), American fashion designer
Michael Costello (public servant), ex-chief of staff to Australian politician Kim Beazley
Michael A. Costello (born 1965), State Representative for the Massachusetts House of Representatives
Michael Copps Costello (1875–1936), Canadian politician
Mike Costello, British sports broadcaster
Michael Joe Costello (1904–1986), Irish Army general
Murray Costello, Canadian member of the Hockey Hall of Fame
Nigel Costello (born 1968), English professional footballer
Paul Costello, American rower and Olympic medalist
Peter Costello, Australian politician
Peter Costello, Canadian Artist 
Robert Costello (19212014), American TV and film producer, writer, and director 
Ryan Anthony Costello (born 1976), American attorney and politician
Ryan Christopher Costello (19962019), American baseball player
Seamus Costello, Irish politician, and member of the Irish Republican Army
Sean Costello, American blues musician
Stephen Costello, American opera tenor
Sue Costello American comedian and actress
Tim Costello, Australian Baptist minister and author
Thomas Joseph Costello (1929–2019), American Roman Catholic bishop
Victor Costello, Irish rugby union player
Vince Costello (1932–2019), American football player
Ward Costello, American actor

Fictional characters with the surname
 Charlie Costello, one of the several psychopaths in the film Seven Psychopaths, portrayed by actor Woody Harrelson
 Ermes Costello, side character in the manga JoJo's Bizarre Adventure Part 6: Stone Ocean.
 Esther Costello, the deaf mute title character of the film The Story of Esther Costello, portrayed by actress Heather Sears
 Frank Costello, the antagonist of the film The Departed, portrayed by actor Jack Nicholson
 Frank "Punch" Costello, the "most drunken" character in chapter 14, the Oxen of the Sun episode, of James Joyce's Ulysses.
 Jef Costello, the antihero of the film Le Samouraï, portrayed by actor Alain Delon
 Kaitlin Costello, the key witness in the 1982 courtroom drama film The Verdict, portrayed by actress Lindsay Crouse
 Maggie Costello, the protagonist of The Last Testament, book by Sam Bourne
 Martha Costello QC, the lead character in the 2011- BBC series Silk, portrayed by actress Maxine Peake
 Suzie Costello, a character from the British television show Torchwood, portrayed by actress Indira Varma 
 The Costello family in Hollyoaks, a British television show
 The Costello family in Tangerine, book by Edward Bloor
 The Costello family in The Clinic, an Irish television show

See also
Castello (surname)
Castillo (surname)
Costello (disambiguation)
Costelloe (disambiguation)

References

Anglicised Irish-language surnames
Irish families
Surnames of Irish origin